The Supreme Administration of the Northern Region (VUSO; Severnaya Oblast) was an anti-Bolshevik left-wing Allied government part of the White movement during the Russian Civil War.

History

On 2 August 1918, the Supreme Administration of the Northern Region was declared in a coup by White Russians, led by Captain Georgi Chaplin, on the eve of Allied occupation of Arkhangelsk. British diplomats had traveled to Arkhangelsk in preparation of the invasion, and Major-general Frederick Poole had coordinated the coup with Chaplin. Allied warships sailed into the port from the White Sea. General Poole ran Archangelsk as Commander of British troops in Northern Russia, declaring martial law and banning the red flag, despite the decision of the Supreme Administration of the Northern Region to fly it.

On 6 August 1918, the Murmansk Krai Soviet authorized Chairman Yuryev to agree on the inclusion of Murmansk Krai into the Supreme Administration of the Northern Region. On 6 September 1918, Chairman Nikolai Tchaikovsky was ousted by the White Russian military in Arkhangelsk and incarcerated in a monastery on the nearby Solovetsky Islands. (He was later freed that same month.) On 15 September 1918, the Supreme Administration of the Northern Region issued a resolution which accepted Murmansk Krai as a part of the Supreme Administration of the Northern Region. On 28 September 1918, the Supreme Administration of the Northern Region became the Provisional Government of the Northern Region.

Chairman of the Supreme Administration of Northern Region (Severnaya Oblast)

Territorial control

During its height of control, the Supreme Administration of the Northern Region controlled the overwhelming majority of the Arkhangelsk Governorate (using the 1917 governorate borders of the Russian Republic), about half of the Olonets Governorate (using the 1917 governorate borders of the Russian Republic), and a tiny part of the Vologda Governorate (using the 1917 governorate borders of the Russian Republic).

References

1918 establishments in Russia
1918 disestablishments in Russia
Russian Civil War
States and territories disestablished in 1918
States and territories established in 1918
White Russia